Peggy is a 1977 album by Peggy Lee that was arranged and conducted by Pete Moore.

Track listing
"The Hungry Years" (Neil Sedaka, Howard Greenfield) - 3:25
"Here Now" (Mark A. Trujillo, Dan Kimpel) - 3:16
"I Go to Rio" (Peter Allen) - 2:42
"I'm Not in Love" (Graham Gouldman, Eric Stewart) - 4:42
"Star Sounds" (Johnny Mercer) - 3:30
"What I Did for Love" (Edward Kleban, Marvin Hamlisch) - 3:39
"Misty" (Johnny Burke, Erroll Garner) -3:19
"Every Little Movement" (Otto Harbach, Karl Hoschna) - 3:10
"Courage, Madam" (Peggy Lee, Pete Moore) - 4:15
"Switchin' Channels" (Ken Barnes, Moore) - 3:15
"Just for Tonight" (Jan Jessel, Ray Jessel) - 3:20
"Lover" (Richard Rodgers, Lorenz Hart) - 4:06

Personnel
 Peggy Lee – vocals
Arranged By, Music Director – Pete Moore
Backing Vocals – Clare Torry, Joan Baxter, Maggie Stredder, Peggy Lee
Sleeve Design – Bill Smith
Photography By – Hans Albers
Producer – Ken Barnes
Synthesizer – Pete Moore
Programmed By – Dave Lawson

References

External links
https://peggyleediscography.com/p/LeePolydor.php

1977 albums
Albums produced by Ken Barnes (writer)
Peggy Lee albums
Polydor Records albums